AFI Silver Theatre and Cultural Center or commonly known as AFI Silver  is a three-screen movie theater complex in downtown Silver Spring, Maryland, north of Washington, D.C.

Background
Its main auditorium hosts the DC Metro area's third-largest commercial movie theater screen, and the second largest commercial movie theater screen outside of the Smithsonian Institution after the Uptown Theater in Cleveland Park. Run by the American Film Institute, it plays modern art-house and independent works alongside classic films. 

The AFI Silver is the result of a restoration project for the original Silver Theatre in Silver Spring, designed by movie palace architect John Eberson and constructed in 1938.

Events 
The theater hosts the annual AFI Docs documentary festival (formerly known as Silverdocs).

References

External links 
 AFI Silver Official Homepage
 AFI Docs AFI Docs Homepage
  Silver Spring's Downtown

American Film Institute
Art Deco architecture in Maryland
Buildings and structures in Montgomery County, Maryland
Cinemas and movie theaters in Maryland
Downtown Silver Spring, Maryland
John Eberson buildings
Tourist attractions in Montgomery County, Maryland